Neelwafurat.com is an Internet e-commerce website, similar to amazon.com, which serves primarily the Middle East and Arab World. The company sells books, magazines, films and software.

Overview 
The company was founded and launched in 1998, and was part of a large boom in Arab World use of e-commerce. The name Neelwafurat is a term referring to the Nile and Euphrates rivers (neel means "Nile", "wa" is a phonetic spelling of the specific letter waw, and furat means "Euphrates"). This is a reference to the Amazon.com connection with the Amazon River.

Neelwafurat's headquarters is located in Beirut, Lebanon. There is an additional branch in Egypt.

In 2004, the two best-selling novels on Neelwafurat were Cities of Salt by Abdul-Rahman Munif and The Insane Asylum by Ghazi al-Gosaibi, however both of these books were banned in Saudi Arabia.  The web retailer is seen as a primary part of Lebanon's New Economy, and is a major outlet for independent publishers.

Neelwafurat's primary competitors are adabwafan.com and e-kotob.com.

References

External links 
 Short Arabic-Language about the company
 A sample external listing at iraqoftomorrow.com

1998 establishments in Lebanon
Book selling websites
Retail companies established in 1998
Arab mass media
Internet properties established in 1998
Online retailers of Lebanon
Companies based in Beirut